Snydertown is a borough in Northumberland County, Pennsylvania, United States. As of the 2010 census, the borough population was 339.

History
The first owner of property in Snydertown was Godfrey Rockefeller. His land passed into the hands of Joseph Snyder, for whom Snydertown is named. Snydertown was incorporated from Shamokin Township in 1871.

Geography

Snydertown is located at  (40.873399, -76.670632). According to the United States Census Bureau, the borough has a total area of 3.5 square miles (9.0 km2), all  land.

Shamokin Creek passes through Snydertown. Most of Snydertown's terrain is hilly, but  is flat near Shamokin Creek. Most of the land in the borough is forest, but there is some farmland.

Demographics

As of the census of 2000, there were 357 people, 136 households, and 99 families residing in the borough. The population density was 102.4 people per square mile (39.5/km2). There were 143 housing units at an average density of 41.0 per square mile (15.8/km2). The racial makeup of the borough was 99.16% White, 0.56% Asian, and 0.28% from two or more races.

There were 136 households, out of which 31.6% had children under the age of 18 living with them, 61.0% were married couples living together, 7.4% had a female householder with no husband present, and 26.5% were non-families. 22.1% of all households were made up of individuals, and 7.4% had someone living alone who was 65 years of age or older. The average household size was 2.60 and the average family size was 3.04.

In the borough the population was spread out, with 23.8% under the age of 18, 6.7% from 18 to 24, 31.1% from 25 to 44, 26.6% from 45 to 64, and 11.8% who were 65 years of age or older. The median age was 39 years. For every 100 females there were 113.8 males. For every 100 females age 18 and over, there were 100.0 males.

The median income for a household in the borough was $40,250, and the median income for a family was $41,563. Males had a median income of $30,000 versus $20,625 for females. The per capita income for the borough was $15,107. About 5.9% of families and 7.6% of the population were below the poverty line, including 10.4% of those under age 18 and none of those age 65 or over.

References

Populated places established in 1796
Boroughs in Northumberland County, Pennsylvania
1871 establishments in Pennsylvania